USS Varuna was a screw steamer acquired by the Union Navy during the American Civil War.  Under construction in 1861, she was purchased incomplete on 31 December.  After being commissioned in February 1862, she traveled to join the West Gulf Blockading Squadron.  Varuna was present when Flag Officer David Glasgow Farragut led an attack against Confederate positions at Fort Jackson and Fort St. Philip on 24 April.  During the action, Varuna ran ahead of the other Union ships, and was engaged in a chase with the Louisiana gunboat Governor Moore.  After closing in on the Union ship, Governor Moore rammed Varuna twice, with the gunboat CSS Stonewall Jackson adding a third blow.  Varuna sank within 15 minutes, but Farragut was able to capture the city of New Orleans, Louisiana.

Construction and characteristics 
The American Civil War broke out in April, and the Union adopted the Anaconda Plan, which involved blockading the Confederate coastline and taking control of the Mississippi River.  At the beginning of the war, the Union Navy had only 42 ships still considered active, with others mothballed and in poor condition. Many of the existing active ships were too large to enter the ports that would need to be blockaded.  The Union found itself needing a number of new ships in order to fulfill the new operations goals.

Varuna, who was named after a Vedic deity associated with the skies and seas, was laid down at the Mallory Yard of Mystic, Connecticut, in late January or early February, 1861. Launched in September 1861, she was intended to be used as a merchant ship on the trade route between New York City and New Orleans, Louisiana.  The Union Navy purchased Varuna on 31 December, at New York City, before her construction had been completed.

According to naval historian Paul H. Silverstone, she had a tonnage of 1,247 tons burthen, while the Dictionary of American Naval Fighting Ships (DANFS) places her tonnage at 1,300 tons. Her depth of hold was  She was a steamship and was powered by a single screw propeller. Her crew numbered 157. She was armed with eight  Dahlgren guns and two  Parrott rifles. The naval historian W. Craig Gaines describes Varuna as either a sloop or a corvette, while the DANFS describes her as a screw gunboat.

Service history 
Varuna was commissioned in February 1862.  On 10 February, she was briefly ordered to wait in New York City while the ironclad USS Monitor was completed, so that she could escort Monitor to Hampton Roads.  However, this order was revoked later that day, and Varuna became part of the West Gulf Blockading Squadron.  On her way to join the squadron, Varuna called at the port of Port Royal, South Carolina.  As the Union commander at Port Royal, Flag Officer Samuel Du Pont, was absent on an expedition south along the Confederate coastline, Varunas captain, Commander Charles S. Boggs, temporarily took command of the area. Varuna would not reach the West Gulf Blockading Squadron until 6 March.

In January, the commander of the West Gulf Blockading Squadron, Flag Officer David Glasgow Farragut, had been tasked with capturing New Orleans for the Union.  Farragut would have both a fleet of warships and the Mortar Flotilla.  In late February, he arrived at Ship Island, a strategic island off the coast of Mississippi, and after preparations, the advance up the Mississippi towards New Orleans began on 15 April.  The mortars of the Mortar Flotilla began bombarding two Confederate forts downriver from New OrleansFort Jackson and Fort St. Philip on 18 April, with the shelling continuing for another five days.  Union vessels were able to breach a barricade erected in the river on 20 April, and at 02:00 on 24 April, Farragut's ships began moving against the two forts, bringing on the Battle of Forts Jackson and St. Philip.

Varuna sunk in action 

Farragut assigned 17 warships for the attack on the forts, dividing them into three groups.  Varuna was one of eight ships in the first group, which was tasked with moving up the eastern side of the river to engage Fort St. Philip.  Confederate fire opened at around 03:40.  The lead Union ship was USS Cayuga, who moved towards Fort St. Philip and engaged the ironclads CSS Louisiana and CSS Manassas.  Varuna fired into the duel, damaging both the Union and Confederate vessels, and USS Oneida came to the aid of Cayuga as well.  While Oneida held position and fired at the forts, Varuna then broke formation and continued upriver, despite having engine trouble that resulted in low boiler pressure.  Encountering a group of Confederate gunboats, Varuna fired at them, and continued upriver.  Varuna was now the leading Union ship, and was spotted by the State of Louisiana gunboat Governor Moore.  The Union ship could be identified by the color of light she showed on her masthead, as Confederate vessels carried a different color of light.

The two ships then began a chase upriver. Governor Moore fired with the chase gun on her bow, while Varuna fired with her stern chase gun. The gunboat CSS Jackson briefly fired into the melee, but then continued upriver to New Orleans. Governor Moore approached yet closer, but found that her forward gun could not be depressed enough to rake Varunas deck, so her captain ordered the gun fired through her own deck, with the hole serving as a gun port. A second shot through the hole killed three men aboard Varuna and wounded others.

It was now about 06:00, and the ships were at a point about  upriver from the forts.Varuna turned to starboard to allow for a broadside to be fired from that side of the ship. The broadside caused great destruction on Governor Moores deck, but Governor Moore rammed Varuna, knocking out the Union ship's engines. Governor Moore then backed off and rammed Varuna again. Varuna was now sinking rapidly, and steered towards the riverbank. The gunboat CSS Stonewall Jackson then arrived and rammed Varuna. Varuna sank within 15 minutes, with her guns still firing as she went down. Eight sailors aboard the vessel later received the Medal of Honor for their actions in the engagement. Governor Moore in turn was scuttled not long after her victory over Varuna.

By mid-morning, Farragut had 13 of his ships upriver past the forts.  Most of the Confederate ships present had been sunk, and the two forts surrendered on 28 April, after their garrisons mutinied.  After neutralizing Confederate defenses at Chalmette on 25 April, the Union vessels entered New Orleans.  The fall of the city was a major defeat for the Confederates.  The DANFS states that Varuna "contributed greatly" to the Union victory, and George Henry Boker wrote a poem commemorating the vessel. Her wreck was partially visible in 1885, and a 1981 expedition led by Clive Cussler located a signal with a gradiometer near where she is believed to have sunk.

Notes

References

Sources
 
 

 
 
 
 
 

Ships of the Union Navy
Ships built in Mystic, Connecticut
Gunboats of the United States Navy
Steamships of the United States Navy
Shipwrecks of the Mississippi River
Shipwrecks of the American Civil War
Louisiana in the American Civil War
1861 ships
Maritime incidents in April 1862